Takap (also Romanized as Tāḵāp; also known as Tāg Āb, Tākāb, and Talkāb) is a village in Qilab Rural District, Alvar-e Garmsiri District, Andimeshk County, Khuzestan Province, Iran. At the 2006 census, its population was 146, in 28 families.

References 

Populated places in Andimeshk County